A Ticket office can refer to:
An office where passengers can buy train tickets.
A box office where tickets are sold for admission to events.
An airline city ticket office.